Electrical steel (E-steel, lamination steel, silicon electrical steel, silicon steel, relay steel, transformer steel) is speciality steel used in the cores of electromagnetic devices 
such as motors, generators, and transformers because it reduces power loss. It is an iron alloy with silicon as the main additive element (instead of carbon). The exact formulation is tailored to produce specific magnetic properties: small hysteresis area resulting in low power loss per cycle, low core loss, and high permeability.

Electrical steel is usually manufactured in cold-rolled strips less than 2 mm thick.  These strips are cut to shape to make laminations which are stacked together to form the laminated cores of transformers, and the stator and rotor of electric motors. Laminations may be cut to their finished shape by a punch and die or, in smaller quantities, may be cut by a laser, or by wire electrical discharge machining.

Metallurgy
Electrical steel is an iron alloy which may have from zero to 6.5% silicon (Si:5Fe). Commercial alloys usually have silicon content up to 3.2% (higher concentrations result in brittleness during cold rolling). Manganese and aluminum can be added up to 0.5%.

Silicon increases the electrical resistivity of iron by a factor of about 5; this change decreases the induced eddy currents and narrows the hysteresis loop of the material, thus lowering the core loss by about three times compared to conventional steel. However, the grain structure hardens and embrittles the metal; this change adversely affects the workability of the material, especially when rolling. When alloying, contamination must be kept low, as carbides, sulfides, oxides and nitrides, even in particles as small as one micrometer in diameter, increase hysteresis losses while also decreasing magnetic permeability. The presence of carbon has a more detrimental effect than sulfur or oxygen.  Carbon also causes magnetic aging when it slowly leaves the solid solution and precipitates as carbides, thus resulting in an increase in power loss over time. For these reasons, the carbon level is kept to 0.005% or lower. The carbon level can be reduced by annealing the alloy in a decarburizing atmosphere, such as hydrogen.

Iron-silicon relay steel

Physical properties examples
 Melting point: ~1,500 °C (example for ~3.1% silicon content)
 Density: 7,650 kg/m3 (example for 3% silicon content)
 Resistivity (3% silicon content): 4.72×10−7 Ω·m  (for comparison, pure iron resistivity: 9.61×10−8 Ω·m)

Grain orientation

Electrical steel made without special processing to control crystal orientation, non-oriented steel, usually has a silicon level of 2 to 3.5% and has similar magnetic properties in all directions, i.e., it is isotropic. Cold-rolled non-grain-oriented steel is often abbreviated to CRNGO.

Grain-oriented electrical steel usually has a silicon level of 3% (Si:11Fe). It is processed in such a way that the optimal properties are developed in the rolling direction, due to a tight control (proposed by Norman P. Goss) of the crystal orientation relative to the sheet. The magnetic flux density is increased by 30% in the coil rolling direction, although its magnetic saturation is decreased by 5%. It is used for the cores of power and distribution transformers, cold-rolled grain-oriented steel is often abbreviated to CRGO.

CRGO is usually supplied by the producing mills in coil form and has to be cut into "laminations", which are then used to form a transformer core, which is an integral part of any transformer. Grain-oriented steel is used in large power and distribution transformers and in certain audio output transformers.

CRNGO is less expensive than CRGO. It is used when cost is more important than efficiency and for applications where the direction of magnetic flux is not constant, as in electric motors and generators with moving parts. It can be used when there is insufficient space to orient components to take advantage of the directional properties of grain-oriented electrical steel.

Amorphous steel
This material is a metallic glass prepared by pouring molten alloy onto a rotating cooled wheel, which cools the metal at a rate of about one megakelvin per second, so fast that crystals do not form. Amorphous steel is limited to foils of about 50 µm thickness. The mechanical properties of amorphous steel make stamping laminations for electric motors difficult.  Since amorphous ribbon can be cast to any specific width under roughly 13 inches and can be sheared with relative ease, it is a suitable material for wound electrical transformer cores. In 2019 the price of amorphous steel outside the US is approximately $.95/pound compared to HiB grain-oriented steel which costs approximately $.86/pound. Transformers with amorphous steel cores can have core losses of one-third that of conventional electrical steels.

Lamination coatings
Electrical steel is usually coated to increase electrical resistance between laminations, reducing eddy currents, to provide resistance to corrosion or rust, and to act as a lubricant during die cutting. There are various coatings, organic and inorganic, and the coating used depends on the application of the steel. The type of coating selected depends on the heat treatment of the laminations, whether the finished lamination will be immersed in oil, and the working temperature of the finished apparatus. Very early practice was to insulate each lamination with a layer of paper or a varnish coating, but this reduced the stacking factor of the core and limited the maximum temperature of the core.

ASTM A976-03 classifies different types of coating for electrical steel.

Magnetic properties
The typical relative permeability (μr) of electrical steel is 4,000 times that of vacuum.

The magnetic properties of electrical steel are dependent on heat treatment, as increasing the average crystal size decreases the hysteresis loss. Hysteresis loss is determined by a standard Epstein tester and, for common grades of electrical steel, may range from about 2 to 10 watts per kilogram (1 to 5 watts per pound) at 60 Hz and 1.5 tesla magnetic field strength.

Electrical steel can be delivered in a semi-processed state so that, after punching the final shape, a final heat treatment can be applied to form the normally required 150-micrometer grain size. Fully processed electrical steel is usually delivered with an insulating coating, full heat treatment, and defined magnetic properties, for applications where punching does not significantly degrade the electrical steel properties. Excessive bending, incorrect heat treatment, or even rough handling can adversely affect electrical steel's magnetic properties and may also increase noise due to magnetostriction.

The magnetic properties of electrical steel are tested using the internationally standard Epstein frame method.

The size of magnetic domains in sheet electrical steel can be reduced by scribing the surface of the sheet with a laser, or mechanically. This greatly reduces the hysteresis losses in the assembled core.

Applications
Non-grain-oriented electrical steel (NGOES) is mainly used in rotating equipment, for example, electric motors, generators and over frequency and high-frequency converters. Grain-oriented electrical steel (GOES), on the other hand, is used in static equipment such as transformers.

See also
Ferrosilicon, starter material for silicon steel

References

External links
 Dynamic domain movement video Video-File from YouTube
Summary of Silicon Steels

Steels
Electromagnetic components
Magnetic alloys
Silicon alloys